The Independence Party  is an Islamist political party in Egypt. The party was banned by the Cairo Urgent Matters Court on 29 September 2014.
The party withdrew from the Anti-Coup Alliance on 30 November 2014. Many members of the party were arrested following the 2019 Egyptian protests.

References

Banned Islamist parties
Banned political parties in Egypt
Islamic political parties in Egypt
Political parties in Egypt
Political parties with year of establishment missing